Dioryctria schuetzeella is a moth of the family Pyralidae. It is found in most of Europe, except the Balkan Peninsula, the Iberian Peninsula, Ireland and Ukraine.

The wingspan is 21–28 mm. The moth flies in one generation from June to August.

The caterpillars feed on Picea abies.

References

External links
Lepidoptera of Belgium
UKMoths

Moths described in 1899
schuetzeella
Moths of Europe